Melt Bar and Grilled is a restaurant with six main and three satellite locations in Ohio that specializes in gourmet grilled cheese sandwiches and other comfort food favorites. The restaurant was founded in 2006 in Lakewood, Ohio by Matt Fish, who currently owns and operates the restaurants as the chief executive officer.

Melt has enjoyed notoriety both locally and nationally. Matt Fish's creations and the popular Cleveland restaurant have been featured in USA Today,  Esquire Magazine, as one of the best sandwiches in America; and in National Culinary Review.

Locations

Main locations
Lakewood, opened in September 2006, at 14718 Detroit Avenue.
Independence, opened in October 2011, at 6700 Rockside Road.
Mentor, opened in November 2012, at 7289 Mentor Avenue.
Columbus (Easton), opened in December 2014, at 4206 Worth Avenue.
Akron, opened in June 2016, at 3921 Medina Road.
Avon, opened in August 2017, at 35546 Detroit Road.

Satellite locations

Melt University, opened in August 2014, at the Tinkham Veale University Center at Case Western Reserve University.
Melt Ballpark, opened in April 2015, at Progressive Field.
Cedar Point, opened in May 2017, at 1 Cedar Point Drive.

Closed locations
 Cleveland Heights, opened in May 2010, closed in November 2020, at 13463 Cedar Road.
 Melt Public Square, opened in September 2016, at Café 200 Public Square.
 Columbus (Short North), opened in November 2013, closed in July 2022, at 840 North High Street.,
 Dayton, opened in June 2017, Closed in January 2023, at 2733 Fairfield Commons.,
 Canton, opened in November 2017, Closed in January 2023, at 4230 Belden Village Mall Circle.,

Television appearances
Melt has been featured on several food-themed television shows. Food Network's Diners, Drive-Ins and Dives, with Guy Fieri, featured the original location in an episode that aired on February 8, 2010,

The Travel Channel show Man v. Food with Adam Richman also featured the original location in an episode that aired June 22, 2010.

In 2011, Melt was featured on the Food Network show The Best Thing I Ever Ate, in the messy food themed episode for their "Godfather" lasagna grilled cheese sandwich.

In 2012, Melt was featured in a cheese-themed episode of the Travel Channel's Amazing Eats, another Adam Richman-hosted show.

In 2013, Melt was featured in Cheese Paradise on the Travel Channel.

References

External links
Official Website

Restaurants in Ohio
Companies based in Ohio
Cleveland Heights, Ohio
Lakewood, Ohio
Restaurants established in 2006
Cheese retailers